Ľuboš Kostelný is a Slovak stage, television and film actor.

Biography 
He was born 5 July 1981 in Martin, Czechoslovakia. He studied the Conservatory and VŠMU in Bratislava. He is a member of the ensemble of the Slovak National Theatre.

He was among two Slovaks injured in 2011 Domodedovo International Airport bombing, with the actress Zuzana Fialová.

Filmography
3 sezóny v pekle (3 Seasons in Hell) (2009)
"Ako som prežil" (2009) TV series ....
Bratislavafilm (2009)
"Profesionáli" (2008) TV series
Taková normální rodinka (2008)
Ženy môjho muža (2008)
Muzika (2007) .... Martin
O rodičích a dětech (2007)
Podvraťáci (2005) (TV) ... Emilián
Slunečný stát (The City of the Sun) (2005) .... Vinco
Ticho (2005) (TV) .... Karol
"Záchranáři" (2001) TV series .... Martin Stropko
Rebelové (2001) .... Eman
Krajinka (2000) .... Vinco
Sokoliar Tomáš (1999) .... Vincko
Katarína Hudáková odišla na večnosť (1997)

Theatre

National Theatre
Incident .... Artie
Kaukazský kriedový kruh .... Azdak
Platonov .... Platonov
Bash .... John
V hodine rysa .... Boy
Mizantrop .... Filint
Veľkolepý paroháč .... Bruno
Hra o svätej Dorote .... Devil
Dom nad oceánom .... Lionel
Ignorant a šialenec .... Doctor
Tak sa na mňa prilepila .... Bouzin
Manon Lescaut .... Des Grieux
Hana Jurgová .... Jurga
Mrzák z Inishmaanu .... Billy
Hamlet .... Hamlet
Plantáž .... Matúš/Téza
Three Sisters .... Aleksey Petrovich Feoditik
Tanec toreádorov .... Gaston

References

External links 
Ľuboš Kostelný: Prečo ho ženy milujú? (Dnes.sk) 

1981 births
Living people
People from Martin, Slovakia
Slovak male film actors
Slovak male stage actors
Slovak male television actors
Sun in a Net Awards winners